Peginterferon-alfa may refer to:

 Peginterferon alfa-2a, an antiviral drug used in treatment for hepatitis C and hepatitis B
 Peginterferon alfa-2b, a treatment for hepatitis C

See also
 Interferon